Prince Maphevu Harry Dlamini (31 March 1922 – 25 October 1979) was Prime Minister of Swaziland from 17 March 1976 until his death on 25 October 1979.

Biography 
Dlamini was a member of the House of Dlamini, the Swazi royal family, and also served in the country's military, where he rose to the rank of major general.

After his appointment, he supported the policy of King Sobhuza II, who abolished the parliamentary regime on March 25, 1977. Dlamini died in power.

References 

1922 births
1979 deaths
Prime Ministers of Eswatini
Swazi royalty